The Scottish Club Youth Competitions conference structures established for the 2015–16 season group clubs based on the development structures they have in place, the volume of teams they operate and results over recent seasons. The fixture programmes arranged by Scottish Rugby will guarantee blocks of 'club v club' fixtures in the autumn phase of the season.

History
In December 2013 Scottish Rugby launched its strategic initiative ‘Youth Rugby – A
strategy for Schools’. Former Scotland rugby coach Frank Hadden conducted the review for Scottish Rugby.

In recent years youth rugby has had many changes in competition structure mainly
based on the needs and wants of participating teams, some teams have thrived, some
teams have struggled but change has been a constant and it is obvious that the current
structure continues to be affected by; withdrawal of teams from leagues, weather, lack
of competitive fixtures for some teams, a disjointed approach to fixturing, a reluctance
by some to play on a regular basis. There is no doubt that the structure for youth rugby has reached a point where a radical change in approach is required to bring
stability to our game.

The President’s Conference

Teams fielded:
 U18
 U16 
 S3 (U15) 
 S2 (U14) 
 S1 (U13)

|

Central Belt Conferences

Green Conference

Teams fielded:
 U18
 U16 
 S3 (U15) 
 S2 (U14) 
 S1 (U13)

|}

Brown Conference

Teams fielded:
 U18
 U16 
 S3 (U15) 
 S2 (U14) 
 S1 (U13)

|}

Caledonia Conferences

Teams fielded:
 U18
 U16
 S3 (U15)
 S2 (U14)
 S1 (U13)

|}

Teams fielded:
 U18
 U16
 S3 (U15)
 S1/S2 (U14)

|}

References

Youth